Khaneh Sorkh (also Romanized as Khāneh Sorkh) is a village in Kashkan Rural District, Shahivand District, Dowreh County, Lorestan Province, Iran. At the 2006 census, its population was 553, in 115 families.

References 

Towns and villages in Dowreh County